Chandata is a genus of moths of the family Noctuidae.

Species
 Chandata aglaja (Kishida & Yoshimoto, 1978)
 Chandata bella (Butler, 1881)
 Chandata c-nigrum Yoshimoto, 1982
 Chandata partita Moore, 1882
 Chandata taiwana Yoshimoto, 1982
 Chandata tridentata Yoshimoto, 1982

References
 Chandata at Markku Savela's Lepidoptera and Some Other Life Forms
 Natural History Museum Lepidoptera genus database

Hadeninae